The 2014 Great Yarmouth Borough Council election took place on 22 May 2014 to elect members of Great Yarmouth Borough Council in England. This was on the same day as other local elections.

Ward results

Bradwell North

Bradwell South and Hopton

Caister North

Caister South

Central and Northgate

Claydon

East Flegg

Gorleston

Lothingland

Magdalen

Nelson

Southtown and Cobholm

Yarmouth North

References

2014 English local elections
2014
2010s in Norfolk